Erethistoides montana is a species of South Asian river catfish endemic to India where it can be found in Tripura, Assam and Darjeeling.  This species grows to a length of  SL.

References
 

Erethistidae
Fish of Asia
Taxa named by Sunder Lal Hora
Fish described in 1950